Zemlianky is a village in Krasnohrad Raion, Kharkiv Oblast (province) of Ukraine.

Prior to 18 July 2020, Zemlianky was previously located in Kehychivka Raion.

References

Notes

Villages in Krasnohrad Raion
Populated places established in 1885
1885 establishments in the Russian Empire